Robert Lynn Welch (November 3, 1956 – June 9, 2014) was an American professional baseball starting pitcher. He played in Major League Baseball (MLB) for the Los Angeles Dodgers (1978–87) and Oakland Athletics (1988–94). Prior to his professional career, he attended Eastern Michigan University, where he played college baseball for the Eastern Michigan Hurons baseball team. He helped lead the Hurons, coached by Ron Oestrike, to the 1976 College World Series, losing to Arizona in the Championship Game.

Welch was a two-time MLB All-Star, and he won the American League Cy Young Award as the league's best pitcher in 1990. He was a three-time World Series champion - twice as a player and once as a coach. He is the last pitcher to win at least 25 games in a single season (27 in 1990).

Playing career
In a 17-year career, Welch compiled a 211–146 record with 1,969 strikeouts and a 3.47 ERA in 3,092 innings. His 137 wins during the 1980s was third among major league pitchers during that decade, following Jack Morris and Dave Stieb. He won the American League Cy Young Award in 1990 while playing for the Oakland Athletics. He threw two complete games in 1990, both of them shutouts. He finished in the top 10 voting for the National League Cy Young Award twice (1983 and 1987).

Los Angeles Dodgers
Welch gained national fame with Los Angeles in 1978, when as a 21-year-old rookie he struck out Reggie Jackson with two men on base and two out in the top of the ninth inning of Game 2 of the 1978 World Series against the New York Yankees.

On May 29, 1980, Welch pitched a 3–0 one-hitter against the Atlanta Braves, facing the minimum 27 batters. The only Atlanta base runner was Larvell Blanks, who singled in the 4th inning and was retired on a double play.

Welch won his first World Series in 1981 with the Los Angeles Dodgers after they defeated the New York Yankees in six games.

In 1983, he threw a complete-game shutout and hit a solo home run for his team's only run.  This wouldn't happen again until Noah Syndergaard did it in 2019.

Oakland Athletics
 Welch was the third starting pitcher in the rotation for the 1989 World Series champion Oakland A's, compiling a regular-season record of 17-8 and recording a win in his only start in the American League Championship Series against the Toronto Blue Jays. In an odd twist of fate, however, Welch did not throw a single pitch against the San Francisco Giants during the World Series itself. Just minutes before Welch was to take the mound in Game 3, Candlestick Park and the Bay Area were struck by the Loma Prieta earthquake, which caused extensive damage in the region and forced the postponement of the game. When the Series was resumed 11 days later, A's manager Tony La Russa opted to re-use his Game 1 starter, Dave Stewart, for Game 3 in place of Welch, and his Game 2 starter, Mike Moore, for Game 4 in place of originally scheduled starter Storm Davis. The strategy worked, as the A's swept the Series in four games giving him his second World Series.

A two-time All-Star (1980 and 1990), Welch won 14 or more games in eight years, with a career-high 27 in 1990. He received the Cy Young Award that season, and was considered in the MVP vote.

Welch was the starting pitcher of Game 2 of the 1990 World Series against the Cincinnati Reds. Welch's personal catcher throughout much of his Oakland Athletics career was Ron Hassey, as opposed to Terry Steinbach, who caught the majority of the Oakland pitching staff.

Autobiography and alcoholism
In 1991, Welch and The New York Times sports columnist George Vecsey co-wrote Five O'Clock Comes Early: A Cy Young Award-Winner Recounts His Greatest Victory, which chronicled Welch's battle with alcoholism that he said started at the age of sixteen: "I would get a buzz on and I would stop being afraid of girls.  I was shy, but with a couple of beers in me, it was all right."

The book "...marked one of the first times an active professional athlete openly discussed a drinking addiction." An updated version was published after Welch's retirement, and the book was re-released digitally on November 10, 2015.

Retirement
Welch was the pitching coach for the Arizona Diamondbacks when they won the World Series in 2001. During the 2006 World Baseball Classic, Welch served as the pitching coach for The Netherlands. Welch was a pitching coach in the Oakland Athletics organization at the time of his death.

His son Riley Welch was a 34th round selection by the Oakland A's in the 2008 MLB draft out of Desert Mountain high school in Scottsdale, Arizona but did not sign and went on to play college baseball at the University of Hawaii. Riley then signed as an undrafted free agent with the Dodgers. He became a pitching coach at Presentation College, an NAIA school in Aberdeen, South Dakota in 2014.

Death
Welch died of a broken neck resulting from an accidental fall in the bathroom of his Seal Beach, California, home on June 9, 2014, at the age of 57. The Orange County Coroner's Office ruled that Welch suffered a cervical spine fracture "with epidural hemorrhage due to hyperextension of neck" suffered in the fall, negating earlier reports that he had died from a heart attack.

Highlights
American League Cy Young Award (1990)
Two-time All-Star (1980, 1990)
Led league in wins (27, 1990)
Led league in shutouts (4, 1987)
Led league in games started (35, 1991)
Tied at #84 on the all-time wins leaderboard
Third most wins in MLB in the 1980s

Publications

See also

 List of Major League Baseball career wins leaders
 List of Major League Baseball annual wins leaders
 List of Major League Baseball career strikeout leaders

References

External links

Bob Welch Baseball Biography

Cy Young Award winners
National League All-Stars
American League All-Stars
American League wins champions
Los Angeles Dodgers players
Oakland Athletics players
Major League Baseball pitchers
Baseball players from Detroit
Major League Baseball pitching coaches
1956 births
2014 deaths
Sportspeople from Detroit
Eastern Michigan Eagles baseball players
San Antonio Dodgers players
Albuquerque Dukes players
Vero Beach Dodgers players
Arizona Diamondbacks coaches
Accidental deaths from falls
Accidental deaths in California